Suleh or Sooleh or Sowleh may refer to:
 Suleh, Kurdistan
 Suleh, Razavi Khorasan
 Suleh, Zanjan
 Suleh (film), a 1946 Bollywood film